Life with Elizabeth is an American television sitcom starring Betty White as Elizabeth and Del Moore as her husband Alvin; Jack Narz is the on-camera announcer and narrator. The series aired in syndication from October 7, 1953, to September 1, 1955. The show was the first of many sitcoms for Betty White across the decades and was based on sketches involving the Elizabeth character that she had performed on her earlier talk show Hollywood on Television.

The low-budget comedy was produced by and filmed at Los Angeles TV station KLAC-TV (now KCOP-TV) where White and Moore were on the staff (the series was originally a live production on KLAC-TV in 1951). White received her first Primetime Emmy Award nomination for her work on this series.

Premise
Elizabeth and Alvin are an ordinary suburban couple, but inevitably get into predicaments. In the end, Alvin, in variable degrees of frustration, would say, "I shall leave you at this point, Elizabeth" and would walk out of sight. The announcer would say, "Elizabeth, aren't you ashamed?"  She would slowly nod, but then, with a slightly devilish grin, would vigorously shake her head to indicate she was not.

The series was divided into three eight- to ten-minute comic shorts — referred to as "incidents". Sometimes an entire incident might just consist of the two main characters talking to each other. The minimal theme music was played by a solo harpist who was partially visible on the opening title screen.

Production
The series was created by George Tibbles who also served as a writer. The series was produced by Bandy Productions, a production company formed by Betty White and George Tibbles, in association with executive producer Don Fedderson.

Nina Bara appeared in several episodes.

Cancellation
After 65 episodes, the series' production company, Guild Films, chose to cancel the series. While the series was still popular with audiences, Guild Films decided that too many new episodes of Life with Elizabeth would oversaturate secondary markets, thus making the series less profitable in second-run syndication.

Episodes

Broadcast and syndication
The series was exported to Australia during the late 1950s.  Life with Elizabeth aired in syndication on America One, on the HOT (History of Television) Network in New York (WKOB 42.4) & Dallas (K31GL 31.3), and on Lost TV and The Decades Binge on the Decades Network.

On September 11, 1998, Betty White, Jack Narz and Peter Michael Goetz as Alvin participated in a restaging of Life with Elizabeth for 13 at 50, a two-hour retrospective of KCOP-TV's 50th anniversary co-hosted by news anchors Tawny Little and Alan Frio. The segment was filmed in front of a live studio audience, with Betty White playing her original role.

Home media
Because the show was formatted as separate eight-minute sketches, a number of used 16mm prints of the films were cut into individual segments and sold on the "home movies" market by the Superior Bulk Film Co. of Chicago, a mail-order movie equipment dealer, in the late 1960s and 1970s. Since the series entered the public domain, it has been released in volumes of budget DVD releases.

References

External links
 
 

1953 American television series debuts
1955 American television series endings
1950s American sitcoms
Black-and-white American television shows
English-language television shows
First-run syndicated television programs in the United States
Television shows set in Los Angeles